Peter Ascanius (24 May 1723 – 4 June 1803) was a Norwegian-Danish biologist and geologist. He was a professor of zoology and mineralogy.

Early life and education
He was born at Aure in Møre og Romsdal, Norway.  In 1742 he graduated from  Trondheim  Cathedral School and attended the University of Copenhagen where he studied medicine and took a Bachelor's degree in 1747.
From 1752 he stayed a couple of years at Uppsala University where he was a student of Carl Linnaeus (1707–1778).
He  studied natural history with Linnaeus and chemistry and metallurgy with  Johan Gottschalk Wallerius  (1709–1785). Ascanius undertook a study trip in the years 1753 to 1758, visiting the Netherlands, England, France, Italy and Austria.

Career
After returning from his European study trip, in 1759  Ascanius was appointed professor of natural history at the  Royal Danish Academy of Fine Arts which was established at Charlottenborg at Copenhagen  in 1754.
He taught zoology and mineralogy in Copenhagen from 1759 to 1771.  In 1768 he was sent on a research and collection trip along the Norwegian coast from Kristiansand to Bergen. In 1753, Ascanius visited the iron deposit Taberg in Småland.

In the years 1771–1776 he worked as a mining inspector  at the silver  mines in Kongsberg. During  the period 1776–1788, he was made a senior mining official (Berghauptmann) and was given responsibility for iron smelting and hammering at the  Kongsberg Silver Mines and  teaching at the Kongsberg School of Mines.

Late life and death
Ascanius  returned to Copenhagen in 1788. He died unmarried on 4 June 1803 and is buried in the crypt of Frederick's German Church in Christianshavn.

Publications
Among his published works was the five-volume illustrated Icones rerum naturalium. He was a Fellow of the Royal Society, elected in 1755 as a Foreign Member.

See also
:Category:Taxa named by Peter Ascanius

References

External links
Icones rerum naturalium Volume I at the Center for Retrospective Digitization, Göttingen

1723 births
People from Møre og Romsdal
1803 deaths
Norwegian emigrants to Denmark
Danish geologists
18th-century Norwegian zoologists
Norwegian geologists
Fellows of the Royal Society
Age of Liberty people
University of Copenhagen alumni
Uppsala University alumni
Academic staff of the Royal Danish Academy of Fine Arts